Jones County is a county located in the U.S. state of Texas. As of the 2020 census, its population was 19,663.
Its county seat is Anson. The county was created in 1858 and organized in 1881. Both the county and its county seat are named for Anson Jones, the fourth and final president of the Republic of Texas.

Jones County is included in the Abilene, Texas,  metropolitan statistical area.

Geography

Major highways
  U.S. Highway 83
  U.S. Highway 180
  U.S. Highway 277
  State Highway 6
  State Highway 92

Adjacent counties
 Haskell County (north)
 Shackelford County (east)
 Callahan County (southeast)
 Taylor County (south)
 Fisher County (west)
 Stonewall County (northwest)

Demographics

Note: the US Census treats Hispanic/Latino as an ethnic category. This table excludes Latinos from the racial categories and assigns them to a separate category. Hispanics/Latinos can be of any race.

As of the census of 2000, 20,785 people, 6,140 households, and 4,525 families resided in the county.  The population density was 22 people per square mile (9/km2).  The 7,236 housing units averaged 8 per mi2 (3/km2).  The racial makeup of the county was 78.80% White, 11.51% Black or African American, 0.49% Native American, 0.47% Asian, 7.47% from other races, and 1.27% from two or more races.  About 20.9% of the population was Hispanic or Latino of any race.

Of the 6,140 households, 33.40% had children under the age of 18 living with them, 59.60% were married couples living together, 10.10% had a female householder with no husband present, and 26.30% were not families. About 24.1% of all households were made up of individuals, and 13.40% had someone living alone who was 65 years of age or older.  The average household size was 2.58 and the average family size was 3.06.

In the county, theage distribution was 22.50% under 18, 11.10% from 18 to 24, 31.50% from 25 to 44, 21.00% from 45 to 64, and 14.00% who were 65 or older.  The median age was 36 years. For every 100 females, there were 150.10 males.  For every 100 females age 18 and over, there were 159.70 males.

The median income for a household in the county was $29,572, and for a family was $35,391. Males had a median income of $26,892 versus $17,829 for females. The per capita income for the county was $13,656.  About 13.10% of families and 16.80% of the population were below the poverty line, including 22.70% of those under age 18 and 16.60% of those age 65 or over.

Government and infrastructure
The Texas Department of Criminal Justice (TDCJ) operates the Robertson Unit, located 10 miles from downtown. The state Middleton Unit transfer unit is located partially in Abilene and also in Jones County.

Since 2007 Republican Susan King has represented Jones, Nolan, and Taylor Counties in the state house.

Politics
“From their first presidential election in 1884 through 1992 the voters in Jones County have generally chosen Democratic candidates. They supported Republican candidates in 1928, 1952, 1972, 1984, and 1988.“ 

Since 2000, the majority of voters selected Republican presidential candidates, with the margin of victory for the party's candidates increasing in each election.

Communities

Cities

 Abilene (mostly in Taylor County)
 Anson (county seat)
 Hamlin (small part in Fisher County)
 Hawley
 Lueders (small part in Shackelford County)
 Stamford (small part in Haskell County)

Unincorporated communities

 Avoca
 Corinth
 Noodle
 Nugent
 Radium
 Tuxedo

Notable residents
 Charles Stenholm, former member of the United States House of Representatives

See also

 Dry counties
 List of museums in West Texas
 National Register of Historic Places listings in Jones County, Texas
 Recorded Texas Historic Landmarks in Jones County

References

External links

 Jones County government's website
 
 Jones County Profile from the Texas Association of Counties

 
1881 establishments in Texas
Populated places established in 1881
Abilene metropolitan area